Deus Ex Machinae is the debut album by Swedish band Machinae Supremacy. 

Released by Music by Design (MbD) Records UK in 2004, there were initially only 1,000 copies made. In 2005, a further 1,000 were printed featuring remastered tracks, new cover art and a bonus track. In 2006, further copies were printed via Hubnester Industries. The album was released as a free download from band's official website in 2012.

The album was recorded in Blind Dog Studios and Lilla Tomtestudion, Luleå. All songs were composed, written and performed by Machinae Supremacy.

Track listing
"Insidious" – 5:36
"Super Steve" – 5:39
"Dreadnaught" – 4:05
"Flagcarrier" – 6:02
"Return to Snake Mountain" – 5:18
"Player One" – 5:43
"Deus Ex Machinae" – 4:44
"Attack Music" – 3:35
"Ninja" – 5:23
"Throttle and Mask" – 3:59
"Killer Instinct" – 3:53
"Tempus Fugit" – 4:58
"Blind Dog Pride" – 6:25
"Machinae Prime" – 7:12 (instrumental)

Reissue bonus track:
15. "Soundtrack to the Rebellion" – 6:00

Early in production, some songs were given different titles, such as "Player One" which was originally titled "Player One (Return to Arcade)". The song "Deus Ex Machinae" was at one point titled "Hyperion".

Personnel 
Robert Stjärnström – vocals, guitar, art and design
Jonas Rörling – guitar, backing vocals
Kahl Hellmer – bass
Andreas Gerdin – keyboards, backing vocals
Tomas Nilsén – drums

Additional personnel
Thomas Eberger – mastering
Jens Habermann – additional art
Erica Öberg of Inja – vocals on "Flagcarrier"
Stefan Sundström – sound engineer

References

External links
 Official details, lyrics and album download.
 

Machinae Supremacy albums
2004 debut albums